The 2020 IHF Men's Olympic Qualification Tournaments were held in Montenegro, France and Germany. The top two teams from each of the three tournaments qualified for the 2020 Summer Olympics joining six already qualified teams: host nation, world champions and four winners of continental qualifying events.

The tournaments were initially scheduled to take place from 17 to 19 April 2020, but the IHF postponed them to June 2020 due to the COVID-19 pandemic. Following the postponement of the 2020 Summer Olympics to July–August 2021, the IHF announced on 24 April 2020 that the tournaments would be again rescheduled, taking place from 12 to 14 March 2021.

Format
Similar as for previous editions, there were three Olympic Qualification Tournaments. The twelve teams that have not yet qualified through the five events mentioned above were selected based on their performance in the events. These teams were divided into three tournaments, each containing four teams, with two teams from each tournament qualifying for the olympic tournament.

Team selection
Based on the 2019 World Championship and four continental qualifying events, the twelve selected teams were chosen as follows, starting with the World Championship:

 The top six not yet qualified teams from the 2019 World Championship are selected:
WC2 to WC7 - teams ranked 2-7 at the World Championship. If one or more these teams have already qualified (by virtue of winning a continental qualification event or hosting the Olympics), the list is moved up by allocating slots to next best ranked teams (8th and/or thereafter) at the World Championship.  
 The other six teams are selected based on Continental ranking and performance in the respective continental qualification events: 
QS1 to QS4 - slots allocated to the continents ranked one to four respectively. The best ranked teams at the respective continental qualification event not yet qualified and not yet selected will earn the qualification slot.
QS5 - the second slot allocated to the first ranked continent. The second best ranked team at the respective event not yet qualified and not yet selected earn the qualification slot.
QS6 - the last slot. It is allocated to the best team from Oceania qualifying event, if any team from Oceania was ranked between 8th–12th at the World Championship. Otherwise, it will be allocated to the second ranked continent as an additional place. The second best ranked team at the respective event not yet qualified and not yet selected earn the qualification slot.

Pool composition
The twelve selected teams were allocated in three pools of four teams according to the table below.

Teams selected
The team selection process determined the twelve teams that competed in the IHF Olympic Qualification Tournaments based on final rankings of 2019 World Championship and four continental events.

World Championship
Apart from gold medalist and teams which later qualified thru continental qualification events, six best placed teams from 2019 World Championship earned a right to participate in the IHF Olympic Qualification Tournaments.
The assignment of their slot position, used for pool allocation, will be based on the final ranking at World Championship. 

Key

Continental qualification
Apart from teams that have already qualified for Olympics or have already been selected to participate in the Olympic Qualification Tournaments based on their final ranking at World Championship, each continent was rewarded with certain number of qualification slots in accordance with continental ranking from the 2019 World Championship. In total, six additional slots are allocated to all continents and determined according performance at various continental qualification events.

Continental ranking
The best ranked teams of each continent in the 2019 World Championship represent the continent in order to determine the continental ranking.

1Since no team from Oceania participated in the 2019 World Championship, additional slot was allocated to Africa

Europe

Africa

Americas

Asia

Key

The following was the composition of the Olympic Qualification Tournaments:

Referees
The referees were announced on 25 February 2021.

Tournament 1

Standings
The tournament will be played in Montenegro, after Norway had to withdraw the right to host.

Matches
All times are local (UTC+1).

Tournament 2

Standings

Matches
All times are local (UTC+1).

Tournament 3

Standings

Matches
All times are local (UTC+1).

See also
2020 IHF Women's Olympic Qualification Tournaments

References

External links
IHF website

Men's qualification tournaments
Olympics tournaments
IHF
March 2021 sports events in Europe
IHF
IHF
IHF